Stanići may refer to:

 Stanići, Bosnia and Herzegovina, a village near Derventa
 Stanići, Croatia, a village near Omiš

See also
 Stanić